Ángel Alejandro Morales Santos (born 14 June 1975), nicknamed Matute, is an Argentine retired footballer who played as an attacking midfielder.

Club career
Morales was born in Buenos Aires. In his extensive professional career, he represented six clubs in his country, including both Avellaneda giants, Club Atlético Independiente and Racing Club, starting his career at the former and having two spells with both.

His first abroad experience came in June 1997, at the age of 22, as he played in Italy for U.C. Sampdoria for a few months, scoring against Juventus FC. In the ensuing transfer window, he signed with CP Mérida in Spain, but collected almost no La Liga appearances in a relegation-ending season.

After returning to his country, with Racing, Morales moved abroad again, playing for Mexican sides Cruz Azul, Tiburones Rojos de Veracruz and Dorados de Sinaloa. At 33, he signed with Uruguay's Club Nacional de Football and, two years later, in 2010, returned to his country and joined Club Atlético Huracán.

Personal life
Morales' older brother, Carlos, was also a footballer. Also a midfielder, he represented Paraguay internationally, having been born in the country.

References

External links
 
 Ángel Morales – Argentine League statistics at Fútbol XXI  
 Stats at Futbol360 
 
 
 

1975 births
Living people
Footballers from Buenos Aires
Argentine footballers
Association football midfielders
Argentine Primera División players
Club Atlético Independiente footballers
Club Atlético Platense footballers
Racing Club de Avellaneda footballers
Club Atlético Banfield footballers
Olimpo footballers
Club Atlético Huracán footballers
Serie A players
U.C. Sampdoria players
La Liga players
CP Mérida footballers
Liga MX players
Cruz Azul footballers
C.D. Veracruz footballers
Dorados de Sinaloa footballers
Uruguayan Primera División players
Club Nacional de Football players
Argentina youth international footballers
Argentine expatriate footballers
Expatriate footballers in Italy
Expatriate footballers in Spain
Expatriate footballers in Mexico
Expatriate footballers in Uruguay
Argentine expatriate sportspeople in Mexico
Argentine expatriate sportspeople in Uruguay
Argentine expatriate sportspeople in Italy
Argentine expatriate sportspeople in Spain